The 33rd running of the Tour of Flanders cycling classic was held on Sunday, 10 April 1949. Italian Fiorenzo Magni won the race in an 18-man sprint before Belgians Valère Ollivier and Briek Schotte. Magni was the second non-Belgian rider to win the Tour of Flanders, as well as the first Italian. 52 of 225 riders finished.

Route
The race started in Ghent and finished in Wetteren – totaling 260 km. The course featured three categorized climbs:

Results

References

Tour of Flanders
Tour of Flanders
Tour of Flanders
Tour of Flanders